The 2013 FC Gifu season sees FC Gifu compete in J. League Division 2 for the sixth consecutive season as well as competing in the 2013 Emperor's Cup.

Players
As of August 8, 2013

Out on loan

Competitions

J. League

League table

Matches

Emperor's Cup

Squad statistics

Appearances and goals

|-
|colspan="14"|Players who no longer play, or are out on loan, for FC Gifu but have made appearances this season:

|}

Top scorers

Disciplinary record

External links

FC Gifu
2013